Zagora is the third studio album by British R&B band Loose Ends, released in 1986 by MCA Records. The album spawned the hits "Slow Down", "Stay a Little While, Child" and two others, all of which were hits on the U.S. R&B charts, with "Slow Down" reaching number one on the chart.
Between the years 1991-2009 the album sold an additional 303,000 copies in the United States according to Nielsen Soundscan 5 years after its initial release, the album remains uncertified with overall sales unknown.

Track listing

European version

North American version

Charts

Singles

References

External links

1986 albums
Loose Ends (band) albums
MCA Records albums